Râșnov (Transylvanian Saxon dialect: Ruusenåå; Latin: Rosnovia) is a town in Brașov County, Transylvania, Romania with a population of 15,022.

History

The Roman fort of Cumidava was discovered in 1856 near the town.

The Râșnov Fortress was first built as a castle by the Teutonic Knights in the years 1211–1225. Râșnov was mentioned for the first time in 1331 as Rosnou and again in 1388 as villa Rosarum. While the village was razed many times in its history by Tatars, Turks, and Wallachians, the fortress was conquered only once, in 1612, by Gabriel Báthory.

Legend of the fortress well
There is a legend attached to Râșnov Fortress. During a particularly long siege of the fortress, the citizens of Râșnov were concerned about the lack of available fresh drinking water. Two Turkish soldiers, having been captured earlier, were put to the task of digging a well in the centre of the fortress. These two men were assured that they would be given their freedom once the well was completed. According to local legend, it took them 17 years to finish the well, but they were still killed afterwards. This famous well still sits in the centre of Râșnov Fortress, and is 143 metres deep.

Climate
Râșnov has a warm-summer humid continental climate (Dfb in the Köppen climate classification).

Culture

Music
As of August 2013, Râșnov became the host of the first extreme metal festival in Romania, known as Rockstadt Extreme Fest, which was held at the foot of the fortress hill. The festival featured bands such as Decapitated, Napalm Death, Gojira, Carach Angren, Septicflesh, Primordial among many others and it continues to this day.

Film
The American film Cold Mountain (2002) was shot to a large degree in the area around Râșnov.

Sports
Râșnov Sports Complex was built just outside the town in Cărbunării Valley, for 2013 European Youth Winter Olympic Festival, which was hosted in the nearby city of Brașov.

Two ski jumping events took place in Râșnov, as part of the Women's Ski Jumping World Cup 2013/2014 competition. The events were scheduled for March 2014, on the "Valea Cărbunării" slope. During the 2019–20 World Cup, both women and men had events in Râșnov..

See also
 List of castles in Romania
 Tourism in Romania
 Villages with fortified churches in Transylvania

References

External links

 The Râșnov Fortress
 Photos from Râșnov
 Fortress History
 Rockstadt Extreme Fest

Populated places in Brașov County
Localities in Transylvania
Castles of the Teutonic Knights
Towns in Romania
Place names of Slavic origin in Romania
Monotowns in Romania
Burzenland